United States gubernatorial elections were held on November 4, 1980, in 13 states and two territories. The Republican party had a net gain of four seats in this election, with the Senate, House elections and presidential election.

Election results
A bolded state name features an article about the specific election.

See also
1980 United States elections
1980 United States presidential election
1980 United States Senate elections
1980 United States House of Representatives elections